Asjad Iqbal (born 15 November 1991 in Sargodha, Pakistan) is a Pakistani snooker player. He turned professional at the start of the 2022/2023 season. Reaching the final round of the first event of Asia-Oceania Q School in 2022 he earned a two years card for the professional tour via Order of Merit.

Career

2022/2023 season
As Iqbal's tour card was only granted by Order of Merit, after Thanawat Thirapongpaiboon was finally denied the same on 1 September 2022 due to disciplinary issues, he wasn't able to take part in the first tournaments of the tour calendar. The first professional tournament he was able to attend, was the 2022 Scottish Open, but he lost in the qualification round. He secured his first win on tour against the experienced Barry Pinches at the UK Championship qualifying in November 2022.

Performance and rankings timeline

Career finals

Team finals: 4 (3 titles)

Amateur finals: 3

References 

Pakistani snooker players
Living people
1991 births
People from Sargodha